Škoda Transtech Oy is Finland's major domestic manufacturer of low-floor tram and railway rolling stock. It specializes in building tram and railway vehicles for extreme climatic conditions, such as those encountered in Finland.

History

The company was established in 1985 when the Finnish engineering firm Rautaruukki started manufacturing freight wagons in Otanmäki and Taivalkoski. In 1991 the railway rolling stock works of Valmet (in Tampere), which specialized in the manufacture of carriages and locomotives, was merged with Transtech. In 1998 Rautaruukki sold the Taivalkoski factory to Telatek Oy, retaining the Otanmäki plant.

In June 1999 Rautaruukki sold Transtech to Patentes Talgo SA of Spain, but was subsequently sold to the Finnish group Pritech Oy in March 2007. During the period of Spanish ownership, the company was known as Talgo Oy, but has reverted to its previous name. In August 2015 Škoda Transportation bought a 75% stake in the company, purchasing the remaining 25% in May 2018 and rebranding it Škoda Transtech in October 2018.

Rolling stock 

The company has manufactured double-deck carriages (sleeper cars, InterCity 2 passenger cars and vehicle transport carriages) which are used by VR (Finnish Railways). It also provides Helsinki's new articulated trams of the type ForCity Smart Artic for the Helsinki City Transport (HKL).

In October 2016 Transtech was selected to provide 19 trams for the new Tampere light rail system.

Škoda Transtech will also participate in supplying modern trams for German transport company Rhein-Neckar-Verkehr (rnv) together with  Škoda Transportation.

In October 2018 Škoda Transtech sold two pre-series Artic trams to German operator Schöneicher-Rüdersdorfer Strassenbahn GmbH (SRS) in Schöneiche bei Berlin.  The Helsinki Artic vehicle #402, now operating in Schöneiche as #52 is the first Škoda Transportation vehicle to receive German homologation.  The sale was established in cooperation with Helsinki City Transport and the support of Voith Digital Solutions Austria GmbH & Co KG following a two-month trial period from August to October 2018.

In September 2019 Škoda Transtech announced that they had been selected to provide suburban trains for the Latvian passenger railway company PV for a value worth approximately 250 million EUR, with fulfillment of the order starting in 2021 and lasting until 2024.

Location
The company's office is located in Oulu and its main manufacturing base is in Otanmäki, Kajaani. The company’s sales office as well as maintenance services are located in Helsinki.

See also
Lokomo

References

External links

Official website

Companies based in Oulu
Locomotive manufacturers of Finland
Rolling stock manufacturers of Finland
Transportation
Finnish companies established in 1985
Manufacturing companies established in 1985